Bobrov is a village and municipality in Námestovo District in the Žilina Region of northern Slovakia.

History
In historical records the village was first mentioned in 1564.

Geography
The municipality lies at an altitude of 610 metres and covers an area of 25.753 km². It has a population of about 1520 people.

Genealogical resources

The records for genealogical research are available at the state archive "Statny Archiv in Bytca, Slovakia"

 Roman Catholic church records (births/marriages/deaths): 1770-1895 (parish A)

Notable residents
Irena Schusterová – First Lady of Slovakia (1999–2004), born in Bobrov

See also
 List of municipalities and towns in Slovakia

References

External links
https://web.archive.org/web/20071116010355/http://www.statistics.sk/mosmis/eng/run.html
Surnames of living people in Bobrov

Villages and municipalities in Námestovo District